Unlocked may refer to:
 Unlocked (Verbs album), 2003
 Unlocked (Meisa Kuroki album), 2012
 Unlocked (Alexandra Stan album), 2014
 Unlocked (Denzel Curry and Kenny Beats album), 2020
 Unlocked (2006 film), an American short film
 Unlocked (2017 film), an American thriller film
 Unlocked (2023 film), a South Korean thriller film
 Police Files: Unlocked, a 2006–2008 Australian police documentary television series

See also 
 Unlock (disambiguation)